The 2022–23 season is the 139th season in the existence of Derby County Football Club and the club's first season in the third-tier of English football since the 1985–86 season following relegation in the previous season. In addition to the league, they will also compete in the 2022–23 FA Cup, the 2022–23 EFL Cup and the 2022–23 EFL Trophy.

Squad

First team

Transfers

In

Out

Loaned in

Loaned out

Pre-season friendlies
On 22 June, the Rams announced their first two pre-season friendlies, against Bradford City and Stevenage. As well as two home friendly matches against Hertha BSC and Leicester City. On 20 July 2022, Derby County announced they would travel to play Alfreton Town in their final pre-season fixture.

Competitions

Overall record

League One

League table

Results summary

Results by matchday

Matches
On 23 June, the league fixtures were announced.

FA Cup

Derby were drawn away to Torquay United in the first round, and then away to Newport County in the second round, with this tie being confirmed after the Rams defeated Torquay in a replay at home, having drawn the initial match. In the third round, they were back at home against Barnsley, before being drawn at home against West Ham United in the fourth round.

EFL Cup

Derby County were drawn away to Mansfield Town in the first round and at home to West Bromwich Albion or Sheffield United in the second round. They were drawn away to Liverpool in the third round.

EFL Trophy

On 20 June, the initial Group stage draw was made, grouping Derby County with Mansfield Town and Grimsby Town. Three days later, Manchester City U21s joined Northern Group F.

Statistics

|-
! colspan="14" style="background:#dcdcdc; text-align:center"| Goalkeepers

|-
! colspan="14" style="background:#dcdcdc; text-align:center"| Defenders

|-
! colspan="14" style="background:#dcdcdc; text-align:center"| Midfielders

|-
! colspan="14" style="background:#dcdcdc; text-align:center"| Forwards

|}

Goals record

Disciplinary record

Notes

References

Derby County
Derby County F.C. seasons
English football clubs 2022–23 season